Platinum Pohl is a collection of thirty science fiction stories by Frederik Pohl first published in December 2005 by Tor Books. It includes a volume introduction and story introductions by the editor, James Frenkel, plus an afterword by Pohl.

Contents
 Introduction by James Frenkel
 "The Merchants of Venus", Worlds of If, July/August 1972.
 "The Things That Happen", Asimov's, October 1985
 "The High Test", Asimov's, June 1983.
 "My Lady Green Sleeves", Galaxy, February 1957.
 "The Kindly Isle", Asimov's, November 1984.
 "The Middle of Nowhere", Galaxy, May 1955.
 "I Remember a Winter", Orbit 11, Damon Knight (ed.), 1972.
 "The Greening of Bed-Stuy", F&SF, July 1984.
 "To See Another Mountain", F&SF, April 1959.
 "The Mapmakers", Galaxy, July 1955.
 "Spending a Day at the Lottery Fair", F&SF, October 1983.
 "The Celebrated No-Hit Inning", Fantastic Universe, September 1956.
 "Some Joys Under the Star", Galaxy, November 1973.
 "Servant of the People", Analog, February 1983.
 "Waiting for the Olympians", Asimov's, August 1988.
 "Criticality", Analog, December 1984.
 "Shaffery Among the Immortals", F&SF, July 1972.
 "The Day the Icicle Works Closed", Galaxy, February 1960.
 "Saucery", F&SF, October 1986.
 "The Gold at the Starbow's End", Analog, March 1972.
 "Growing Up in Edge City", Epoch, Roger Elwood and Robert Silverberg (eds.), 1975.
 "The Knights of Arthur", Galaxy, January 1958.
 "Creation Myths of the Recently Extinct", Analog, January 1994.
 "The Meeting" (in collaboration with C.M. Kornbluth), F&SF, November 1972.
 "Let the Ants Try", (as by James MacCreigh) Planet Stories, Winter 1949.
 "Speed Trap", Playboy, November 1967.
 "The Day the Martians Came", Dangerous Visions, Harlan Ellison (ed.), 1967.
 "Day Million", Rogue, February/March 1966.
 "The Mayor of Mare Tranq", The Williamson Effect, Tor, 1996.
 "Fermi and Frost", Asimov's, January 1985.
 Afterword : Fifty Years and Counting.

2005 short story collections
Short story collections by Frederik Pohl
Tor Books books
Science fiction short story collections
2000s science fiction works